The Mundaring-Kalamunda Important Bird Area comprises a fragmented 137 km2 of land centred on the towns of Mundaring and Kalamunda in the Darling Scarp region of Western Australia.  It lies inside, as well as adjacent to the Beelu National Park.

Description
The boundaries of the Important Bird Area (IBA) are defined by the presence of blocks of native vegetation greater than 1 ha within a 6 km foraging radius of two prominent, non-breeding season, roost sites for long-billed black cockatoos.

Birds
The site has been identified by BirdLife International as an IBA because it supports about 800 long-billed black cockatoos, and up to 200 short-billed black cockatoos, in the non-breeding season.  It also supports important populations of red-capped parrots, western rosellas, red-winged fairywrens, western spinebills, western thornbills, western yellow and white-breasted robins, and red-eared firetails.  Rufous treecreepers and the forest redtail subspecies of red-tailed black-cockatoo (Calyptorhynchus banksii naso) have been regularly recorded.

References

Important Bird Areas of Western Australia
Kalamunda, Western Australia